Floyd Buford Yates (July 5, 1921 – March 26, 2001), better known as Bill Yates, was an American cartoonist who drew gag cartoons and comic strips before assuming the position of comic strip editor for King Features Syndicate in 1978.

Biography 
Born in Samson, Alabama, Yates learned to cartoon by taking the W. L. Evans Correspondence Course, and his first sale was a five dollar first prize in The Open Road for Boys cartoon contest. He served as an aviator in the United States Navy during World War II, training fighter pilots in Corpus Christi, Texas, where he married Jessie Jean ("Skippy") Hardy. As a journalism student at the University of Texas, he edited the campus humor magazine, The Texas Ranger.

Career 
Moving to New York in 1950, he edited Dell Publishing's cartoon magazines (1000 Jokes, Ballyhoo, For Laughing Out Loud) and Dell's paperback cartoon collections, such as Forever Funny (1956). His comic strip about an absent-minded professor, Professor Phumble, was carried by King Features from 1960 to 1978. (In Brazil during the early 1960s, Professor Phumble was published as Zé Fiasco in the Correio da Manhã newspaper. But his more famous Brazilian nickname is the one used by the Folha de S.Paulo newspaper, Professor Tantã.)

In addition to work on Jimmy Hatlo's Little Iodine, Yates also did the strip Benjy with Jim Berry from 1973 to 1975. In addition to work in advertising and twice-weekly editorial cartoons for the Westport News in Connecticut, Yates also illustrated books and comic books, such as Charlton's Ronald McDonald (1970–71).

When Sylvan Byck retired from King Features Syndicate in 1978, Yates took over the position of comics editor. In 1986, he began collaborating with Morrie Brickman on the political strip, the small society (written lower-case as a satiric nod toward Lyndon Johnson's "Great Society"). The strip carried the signatures of both Brickman and Yates until 1989. It then became a solo effort by Yates, who continued it until 1989. When Gordon Bess, the writer of Redeye (with art by Mel Casson) became ill in May 1988, Yates took over the scripting of that strip about Chief Redeye and his lunatic Chickiepan Indian tribe.

At the end of 1988, Yates left his editorial position at King Features in order to spend full-time cartooning. He continued to write Redeye and do both scripting and art on the small society, but increasing ill health forced his retirement from the strips in 1999. Casson continued to write and draw Redeye for King Features.

Personal life and death 
Yates lived in Westport, Connecticut, for 50 years. In 2001, 3 months after the death of his wife, he died in Norwalk, Connecticut, of complications from pneumonia and Alzheimer's. He was survived by his daughter, Georgia Y. Rojas of Trumbull, Connecticut; his sister, Ralphine Lee of Powder Springs, Georgia; and two grandchildren, Matthew Rojas and Emma Rojas.

References

External links
UT Texas Ranger Archive

1921 births
2001 deaths
American comic strip cartoonists
American magazine editors
People from Geneva County, Alabama
Journalists from Alabama
Military personnel from Alabama
University of Texas alumni
20th-century American journalists
American male journalists